This is a list of singles that have peaked in the top 10 of the French Singles Chart in 2017. 94 singles were in the Top 10 this year which 10 were on the number-one spot.

Top 10 singles

Entries by artists
The following table shows artists who achieved two or more top 10 entries in 2017. The figures include both main artists and featured artists and the peak position in brackets.

See also
2017 in music
List of number-one hits of 2017 (France)

References

External links
 Les Charts.com

Top
France top 10
Top 10 singles in 2017
France 2017